Shankar Das is an Indian cricketer who has played only one first-class match in the 1989/90 season for Tripura Das failed to make an impact in his only appearance and never played for Tripura again.

References

External links
 

Living people
Tripura cricketers
Indian cricketers
East Zone cricketers
Cricketers from Tripura
Year of birth missing (living people)